Jože Berc (born 5 December 1944 in Bled) is a Slovenian rower who competed for Yugoslavia in the men's eight at the 1964 Summer Olympics.

References

External links 
 
 
 

1944 births
Living people
Yugoslav male rowers
People from Bled
Rowers at the 1964 Summer Olympics
Rowers at the 1972 Summer Olympics
Olympic rowers of Yugoslavia
Slovenian male rowers
European Rowing Championships medalists